The women's tournament of the 2013 European Curling Championships will be held from November 22 to 30 at the Sørmarka Arena in Stavanger, Norway. The winners of the Group C tournament in Tårnby, Denmark will move on to the Group B tournament. The top eight women's teams at the 2013 European Curling Championships will represent their respective nations at the 2014 Ford World Women's Curling Championship in Saint John, New Brunswick, Canada.

Group A

Teams
The teams are listed as follows:

Round-robin standings
Final round-robin standings

Sweden won the draw-to-the-button challenge and were given the third seed. Russia and Denmark will play a tiebreaker game for the fourth seed.

Round-robin results

Draw 1
Saturday, November 23, 14:30

Draw 2
Sunday, November 24, 8:00

Draw 3
Sunday, November 24, 16:00

Draw 4
Monday, November 25, 9:00

Draw 5
Monday, November 25, 19:00

Draw 6
Tuesday, November 26, 12:00

Draw 7
Tuesday, November 26, 20:00

Draw 8
Wednesday, November 27, 14:00

Draw 9
Thursday, November 28, 8:00

World Challenge Games
The winner of the best-of-three series between the eighth placed team in Group A and the winner of Group B goes to the 2014 Ford World Women's Curling Championship.

Challenge 1
Friday, November 29, 20:00

Challenge 2
Saturday, November 30, 10:00

Challenge 3
Saturday, November 30, 15:00

 advances to the 2014 Ford World Women's Curling Championship.

Tiebreaker
Thursday, November 28, 15:00

Playoffs

1 vs. 2
Friday, November 29, 13:00

3 vs. 4
Friday, November 29, 13:00

Semifinal
Friday, November 29, 20:00

Bronze-medal game
Saturday, November 30, 10:00

Final
Saturday, November 30, 10:00

Player percentages
Round Robin only

Group B

Teams
The teams are listed as follows:

Round-robin standings
Final round-robin standings

Round-robin results

Draw 1
Saturday, November 23, 8:00

Draw 2
Saturday, November 23, 19:30

Draw 3
Sunday, November 24, 12:00

Draw 4
Sunday, November 24, 20:00

Draw 5
Monday, November 25, 12:00

Draw 6
Monday, November 25, 20:00

Draw 7
Tuesday, November 26, 12:00

Draw 8
Tuesday, November 26, 20:00

Draw 9
Wednesday, November 27, 12:00

Tiebreakers
Wednesday, November 27, 18:00

Thursday, November 28, 8:00

Playoffs

1 vs. 2
Thursday, November 28, 14:00

3 vs. 4
Thursday, November 28, 14:00

Semifinal
Thursday, November 28, 20:00

Bronze-medal game
Friday, November 29, 12:00

Final
Friday, November 29, 12:00

Group C

The four women's teams played a double round robin, and at its conclusion, the top three teams advanced to the playoffs. In the playoffs, the first and second seeds, Slovenia and Belarus played a game to determine the first team to advance to the Group B competitions. The loser of this game, Slovenia, then played a game with the third seed, Slovakia, to determine the second team to advance to the Group B competitions.

Teams
The teams are listed as follows:

Round-robin standings
Final round-robin standings

Round-robin results
All draw times are listed in Central European Time (UTC+1).

Draw 1
Tuesday, October 8, 12:00

Draw 2
Tuesday, October 8, 20:00

Draw 3
Wednesday, October 9, 14:00

Draw 4
Thursday, October 10, 8:00

Draw 5
Thursday, October 10, 16:00

Draw 6
Friday, October 11, 9:00

Tiebreaker
Saturday, October 12, 9:00

Playoffs

First Place Game
Saturday, October 12, 9:00

Second Place Game
Saturday, October 12, 14:00

References
General

Specific

External links

2013 in women's curling
European Curling Championships
International curling competitions hosted by Norway
Women's curling competitions in Norway
Sport in Stavanger
2013 in Norwegian women's sport